Concord station may refer to:
 Concord station (BART), a Bay Area Rapid Transit station in Concord, California
 Concord station (Massachusetts), a commuter rail station in Concord, Massachusetts
 Concord station (New Hampshire), a former commuter rail station in Concord, New Hampshire
 Concord Naval Weapons Station, a military base in Concord, California

See also 
 Concord (disambiguation)